This is a list of prime ministers of Benin (formerly Dahomey) since the formation of the post of Prime Minister in 1960, to its abolition in 2016.

A total of six people have served as Prime Minister (not counting one Acting Prime Minister).

List of officeholders
Key
Political parties

Other factions

Status

Timeline

See also
President of Benin
List of presidents of Benin
Vice President of Benin
List of colonial governors of Dahomey
Politics of Benin

References

External links
World Statesmen (Benin)

Benin

Prime Ministers
1960 establishments in the Republic of Dahomey
Prime ministers